The People's Commissariat for the Building of Military and Naval Enterprises was one of the central offices of the Soviet Union. It oversaw military construction.

The Ministry was established on 19 January 1946 in a split from the People's Commissariat for Building (Народный комиссариат по строительству СССР). In June 1946 it changed its name to the Ministry of the Building of Military and Naval Enterprises (Министерство по строительству военных и военно-морских предприятий СССР - Минвоенморстрой), and functioned until 9 March 1949, when it was dissolved.

List of ministers
 Semjon Ginsburg (19.3.1946 - 19.6.1947)
 Nikolai Dygai (19.6.1947 - 9.3.1949)

References

Building of military and naval enterprises
Defence industry of the Soviet Union